The Mangapwani Lighthouse is located in Bumbwini, Zanzibar, Tanzania. The lighthouse is one of the oldest lighthouses on the island and is a square stone tower, painted with black and white horizontal bands. The lighthouse is near the Mangapwani slave caves, which were built after the slave trade was abolished in 1873.  According to a July 2008 article in Lighthouse Digest, the lighthouse is area is abandoned and stripped by vandals.

See also

List of lighthouses in Tanzania

References

External links 
 Tanzania Ports Authority

Lighthouses in Tanzania
Lighthouses completed in 1886
Lighthouses completed in 1926
Buildings and structures in Zanzibar